John H. Wageman (March 22, 1841 - January 9, 1916) was an American soldier who fought for the Union Army during the American Civil War. He received the Medal of Honor for valor.

Biography
Wageman served in the American Civil War in the 60th Ohio Infantry. He received the Medal of Honor on July 27, 1896 for his actions at the Second Battle of Petersburg on June 17, 1864.

Medal of Honor citation

Citation:

Remained with the command after being severely wounded until he had fired all the cartridges in his possession, when he had to be carried from the field.

Burial
Wageman is buried in the Clover Cemetery, located at Bass Road and State Route 133, which is southeast of Williamsburg, Ohio.

See also

List of American Civil War Medal of Honor recipients: T-Z

References

External links

Clover Cemetery
Military Times

1841 births
1916 deaths
Union Army soldiers
United States Army Medal of Honor recipients
American Civil War recipients of the Medal of Honor
People from Clermont County, Ohio